Policarpo may refer to:

People:
José Policarpo (1936-2014), Roman Catholic Cardinal, Patriarch of Lisbon
Policarpo Bonilla (1858–1926), President of Honduras (1894-1899)
Poli Díaz (born 1966), Spanish former professional boxer
Policarpo Paz García (1932-2000), military officer and President of Honduras {1978-1982)
Policarpo Cacherano d'Osasco (1744-1824), a general in the Napoleonic Wars 
Policarpo Ribeiro de Oliveira (1907-1986), Brazilian footballer
Policarpo Toro (1851-1921), Chilean naval officer

Other uses:
Policarpo (film), a 1959 Italian comedy
Policarpo River, Mitre Peninsula, Argentina